Osmund David Colhoun (born 6 June 1938) is a former Irish cricketer. A right-handed batsman and wicket-keeper, he made his debut for Ireland against Lancashire in July 1959 and went on to play for them on 87 occasions, his last match coming in July 1979 against FW Millet's XI.

Of Colhoun's matches for Ireland, 28 of them had first-class status. His cousin Aubrey Finlay also represented Ireland at cricket.

References

1938 births
Living people
People from Sion Mills
Irish cricketers
Cricketers from Northern Ireland
Wicket-keepers